Agros (Greek: Αγρός) is a village and a community in the western part of the island of Corfu.  It was the seat of the municipality of Agios Georgios.  Agros is located west of the city of Corfu. The community consists of the villages Agros, Aspiotades, Manatades and Rafalades.

Population

See also
List of settlements in the Corfu regional unit

References

External links
 Agros GTP Travel Pages

Populated places in Corfu (regional unit)